Rodrigo Pérez Mackenna (born 21 December 1960) is a Chilean scholar, consultant and entrepreneur. He was bi-minister during president Sebastián Piñera's first government: he served as Housing & Urbanism Minister (2011–2014) and National Assets Minister (2012–2014).

He studied at Pontifical Catholic University of Chile.

After an extensive career in the private sector, he joined the State of Chile in March 2010, being appointment as Libertador General Bernardo O'Higgins Region Intendant. He remained as Intendant until mid-April 2011 when Piñera decided to send him to Housing Minister in replace of Magdalena Matte.

In 2014 was elected Chile's AFP Union Association president.

References

1960 births
Living people
Government ministers of Chile
Chilean academics
20th-century Chilean economists
Chilean people of Irish descent
Pontifical Catholic University of Chile alumni
Rodrigo Perez
Intendants of O'Higgins Region
21st-century Chilean economists